Gop (also known as "Gope") is a town and a NAC under jurisdiction of Puri district in the Indian state of Odisha.  It is one of the main block covered under Puri district. It is famous for the Sun temple, Kathiawar (5th and 6th century AD) comprises square sanctum circumscribed by double courtyards. The important villages like Biratunga, Begunia, Nimapara, Nagapur, Kakatpur, Bhaimapur, Ganeswarpur, Kusabhadra surround Gop.

Geography
It has an average elevation of 6 metres (20 ft).

It is about thirty kilometres from Puri, at the junction where the Konark road branches from the Bhubaneswar to Puri road.

Politics
Gop is part of Jagatsinghpur (Lok Sabha constituency).

See also
Kushabhadra River
Ganeswarpur
Swami Nigamananda
Basudeipur Sub Village
Konark

References

Cities and towns in Puri district